Arnórr Þórðarson jarlaskáld (Poet of Earls) (c. 1012 – 1070s) was an Icelandic skald, son of Þórðr Kolbeinsson. Arnórr travelled as a merchant and often visited the Orkney Islands where he composed poems for the Earls, receiving his byname. For king Magnus the Good, he composed Hrynhenda. He also composed memorial poems for Magnus the Good and Haraldr harðráði. He is considered one of the major skalds of the 11th century.

See also 

 List of Icelandic writers
 Icelandic literature

References
Arnórr jarlaskáld : Hrynhenda Text of the poem with short notes on the poet in Norwegian.

Icelandic male poets
1010s births
1070s deaths
11th-century Icelandic poets